Nicki DeSousa (born 10 May 1966) is a Bermudian equestrian. She competed in the individual eventing at the 1992 Summer Olympics.

References

External links
 

1966 births
Living people
Bermudian female equestrians
Olympic equestrians of Bermuda
Equestrians at the 1992 Summer Olympics
Place of birth missing (living people)